Miguel Angel Estrada Castañeda (born September 25, 1961) is a Honduran-American attorney who became embroiled in controversy following his 2001 nomination by President George W. Bush to the United States Court of Appeals for the District of Columbia Circuit. Senate Democrats, unable to block his nomination in the Senate Judiciary Committee after the Republican Party took control of the U.S. Senate in 2002, used a filibuster for the first time to prevent his nomination from being given a final confirmation vote by the full Senate. They said Estrada was a conservative ideologue with no experience as a judge.

Early life and education

Estrada was born in Tegucigalpa, Honduras. After his parents divorced, he immigrated to the United States to join his mother when he was 17, arriving with a limited command of English.

He graduated magna cum laude and Phi Beta Kappa with a bachelor's degree from Columbia University in 1983. He received a Juris Doctor, magna cum laude, in 1986 from Harvard Law School, where he was an editor of the Harvard Law Review.

Career

Early career 
Following law school, Estrada served as a law clerk, first for Judge Amalya Lyle Kearse of the U.S. Court of Appeals for the Second Circuit, and then for Justice Anthony M. Kennedy of the U.S. Supreme Court during Kennedy's first year on the Court in 1988. One of Estrada's fellow clerks that year was Peter Keisler, another conservative nominee to the D.C. Circuit whose nomination lapsed during the 110th Congress without a Senate vote cast on whether to confirm.

From 1990 until 1992, Estrada served as Assistant U.S. Attorney and Deputy Chief of the Appellate Section, U.S. Attorney's Office, Southern District of New York. In 1992, he joined the United States Department of Justice as an Assistant to the Solicitor General for the George H. W. Bush Administration where he served with now Chief Justice John G. Roberts. In those capacities, Estrada represented the government in numerous jury trials and in many appeals before the U.S. Court of Appeals for the Second Circuit. Before joining the U.S. Attorney's Office, he practiced law in New York with Wachtell, Lipton, Rosen & Katz.

D.C. Circuit Court nomination
George W. Bush nominated Estrada to a position on the United States Court of Appeals for the D.C. Circuit on May 9, 2001. He received a unanimous "well-qualified" rating from the American Bar Association.

Democratic Senators opposed the nomination, noting Estrada's lack of any prior judicial experience at the local, state, or federal level. Additionally, though a member of The Federalist Society, Estrada had never been an academic, so there was no record of his writing by which the Senate could review his record. He had worked in the Office of the Solicitor General under President George H. W. Bush. He had also been a partner in the same law firm as Theodore Olson, working on the legal team that represented George W. Bush in the Bush v. Gore case. He and his record were well known in conservative circles. He was known to be a friend of Ann Coulter, who acknowledged him in her book.

In his testimony before the Senate Judiciary Committee, Estrada said he had never thought about Roe v. Wade, even while serving as a Supreme Court clerk at a time when the first Bush Administration had asked the Court to reconsider it. Also, while as Justice Kennedy's clerk, an article written by Jack Newfield appearing in The Nation magazine alleged that Estrada had disqualified candidates for clerkship who were too liberal while interviewing them. When questioned about this by Senator Charles Schumer during his confirmation hearing, Estrada did not recall the incident. Democratic Senators also objected to the refusal by the Office of the Solicitor General to release samples of Estrada's writings while employed there, although such a release of confidential documents would have been precedent-setting. Minority Leader Tom Daschle was quoted by the Associated Press as saying, "The stumbling block to Miguel Estrada's nomination all along was the administration's refusal to allow him to complete his job application and provide the Senate with the basic information it needed to evaluate and vote on his nomination." A bipartisan group of former Solicitors General, however, wrote a letter objecting to the Democrats' demand for memos that Estrada had written while he was with the office. The letter argued release of prior memos by government employees to the public would endanger the Solicitor General Office's ability to provide confidential legal advice to the Executive Branch.

Leaked internal memos to Democratic Senate Minority Whip Dick Durbin mention liberal interest groups' desire to keep Estrada off the court because of his potential to be a future Supreme Court nominee, and because his Latino roots might make his nomination difficult to oppose. A spokesman for Durbin said that "no one intended racist remarks against Estrada" and that the memo only meant to highlight that Estrada was "politically dangerous" because Democrats knew he would be an "attractive candidate" that would be difficult to contest since he didn't have any record. Democrats argued that Estrada had extreme right-wing views, although others pointed to Estrada's difference with some conservatives on Commerce Clause issues.

On March 6, 2003, there was the first of seven failed cloture votes on Estrada. Fifty-five senators voted to end debate on his nomination and allow a final confirmation vote, and forty-four senators voted not to end debate. After twenty-eight months in political limbo and a protracted six-month battle using the filibuster, Estrada withdrew his name from further consideration on September 4, 2003. Bush nominated Thomas B. Griffith in his place, who was confirmed in 2005 under the terms of the Gang of 14 Deal.

With the benefit of hindsight, Jan Crawford has said of the nomination that "[i]f Majority Leader Bill Frist had shown real leadership, he would never have allowed a Democratic minority to achieve the first-ever filibusters of appeals court nominees. If Trent Lott had been majority leader, Estrada would have been confirmed."

Numerous judicial nominees prior to Estrada had been kept off the courts, when the Senate refused to let the nomination out of committee for a floor vote. A filibuster had been used in 1968 to extend debate regarding the elevation of Associate Justice Abe Fortas to Chief Justice of the United States, but the Estrada filibuster was different in multiple ways. Estrada's was the first filibuster ever to be successfully used against a judicial nominee who had clear support of the majority in the Senate. Estrada's was the first filibuster of any court of appeals nominee. It was also the first filibuster that prevented a judicial nominee from joining a court.

Later career
Estrada is a partner at the Washington, D.C., law office of Gibson, Dunn & Crutcher LLP, where he is a member of the firm's Appellate and Constitutional Law Practice Group as well as the Business Crimes and Investigations Practice Group.

Estrada joined Rudy Giuliani's 2008 presidential campaign as a legal adviser.

In May 2010, Estrada wrote a letter to the Senate Judiciary Committee in support of President Barack Obama's nominee to the U.S. Supreme Court, Elena Kagan, as Estrada and Kagan have remained friends since meeting as students at Harvard Law School. In his letter, Estrada strongly commended Kagan for appointment to the court as "an impeccably qualified nominee" possessed of a "formidable intellect" and an "exemplary temperament." While openly recognizing that her views on judicial role and Constitutional interpretation are "as firmly center-left as my own are center-right," Estrada went on to insist that "one of the prerogatives of the President under our Constitution is to nominate high federal officers, including judges, who share his (or her) governing philosophies." In 1999, Kagan had been nominated by President Clinton to serve on the D.C. Circuit—the same court Estrada was later nominated to. At that time, Kagan was kept off the circuit court because Republicans—the majority party in the Senate—refused to give her a hearing or a vote, though she was not subjected to the filibuster later used by Democrats to block Estrada's nomination.

Likewise, at her confirmation hearing on June 29, 2010, before the United States Senate Committee on the Judiciary, when asked by Senator Lindsey Graham whether she believed that Estrada was qualified to serve on an appellate court, Kagan responded affirmatively and added that she believed Estrada was qualified to serve on the Supreme Court as well. Kagan then told Senator Graham that she would welcome the opportunity to put this belief in writing after her hearing. When questioned by Senator Coburn the following day, she reaffirmed her position, saying that she "...would have voted for him". In July 2010, in follow-up to her promise to Senator Graham, Kagan wrote a letter expressing her belief in Estrada's "superlative" qualifications for appointment to "any federal court," whether to the federal appellate or to the U.S. Supreme Court. In her letter, Kagan commended Estrada as "a towering intellect" with "a prodigious capacity for hard work," also remarking that "no one I know is a more faithful friend or a more fundamentally decent person".

Personal life 
Estrada was married to Laury Gordon Estrada until her death at age 46 on November 28, 2004. She died of an accidental overdose of alcohol and sleeping pills, having also miscarried during the nomination fight.

See also
 George W. Bush judicial appointment controversies
 George W. Bush Supreme Court candidates
 List of law clerks of the Supreme Court of the United States (Seat 1)

References

Further reading

External links
Biographical sketch at the United States Department of Justice
Gibson, Dunn & Crutcher bio

1961 births
Columbia University alumni
Federalist Society members
Harvard Law School alumni
Hispanic and Latino American politicians
Honduran emigrants to the United States
Law clerks of the Supreme Court of the United States
Living people
New York (state) lawyers
New York (state) Republicans
People associated with Gibson Dunn
Wachtell, Lipton, Rosen & Katz people
Latino conservatism in the United States